Pyrus armeniacifolia, also known as the apricot-leaved pear, is a species of plant in the family Rosaceae. It is known from northern Xinjiang, where it is cultivated near Tacheng.

The species was formally described by Tse Tsun Yu in 1963.

References

armeniacifolia
Plants described in 1963